Spinosodus is a genus of longhorn beetles of the subfamily Lamiinae, containing the following species:

 Spinosodus rufomaculatus Breuning, 1973
 Spinosodus spinicollis Breuning & de Jong, 1941

References

Pteropliini